John Cottingham Alderson  (28 May 1922 – 7 October 2011) was a senior British police officer and expert on police and penal affairs.

Alderson was born in Barnsley, West Riding of Yorkshire, and educated at Barnsley Technical College. In 1938 he enlisted in the Highland Light Infantry as a boy soldier and reached the rank of Corporal before transferring to the Army Physical Training Corps in 1941. He served with the APTC in North Africa and Italy and left the Army in 1946 with the rank of Warrant Officer Class II.

He then joined the West Riding Constabulary as a Constable, representing the force in boxing and rugby. He attended the National Police College in 1954 and was promoted Inspector in 1955 (after the statutory minimum nine years' service) and Superintendent in 1960. In 1956 he was a British Memorial Foundation Fellow in Australia and that year he was also called to the bar by the Middle Temple. He attended the Senior Command Course at the Police College in 1963–1964 and was then appointed Deputy Chief Constable of Dorset.

In 1966, he transferred to the Metropolitan Police in London as Deputy Commander (Administration and Operations) and in 1967 became second-in-command of No.3 District (North-East London). In 1968 he became Deputy Assistant Commissioner (Training) and in 1970 was seconded as Commandant of the National Police College. In 1973 he returned to London as Assistant Commissioner "D" (Personnel and Training), but remained in the post less than a year before being appointed Chief Constable of Devon and Cornwall in November 1973, where he remained until his retirement in May 1982.

While Chief Constable he acquired a reputation for radical ideas which were not always popular with other senior police officers, who regarded him as "soft", and was also a champion of community policing. Alderson was frequently portrayed in the media as the polar opposite to James Anderton, Chief Constable of Greater Manchester from 1976 to 1991, who was seen as a champion of hardline, aggressive policing and a more punitive criminal justice system.

He was awarded the Queen's Police Medal (QPM) in 1974 and appointed Commander of the Order of the British Empire (CBE) in 1981.

He became a fellow commoner of Corpus Christi College, Cambridge, and a fellow of the Cambridge Institute of Criminology in 1982 and was also Gwilym Gibbon Research Fellow at Nuffield College, Oxford, from 1982 to 1983. He was visiting professor of police studies at the University of Strathclyde from 1983 to 1989 and a research fellow at the Institute of Police and Criminological Studies at the University of Portsmouth from 1994 to 2000. He returned to Australia in 1987 as Australian Commonwealth Fellow with the Australian Government. He often commentated on police matters in the media.

Alderson was a member of the Liberal Party and unsuccessfully contested the Devon parliamentary seat of Teignbridge in 1983. He served as a consultant on human rights to the Council of Europe from 1981 and was a member of the BBC General Advisory Council from 1971 to 1978. He also served on the committee of the Royal Humane Society from 1973 to 1981 and was president of the Royal Life-Saving Society from 1974 to 1978.

Alderson married Irené Macmillan Stirling in 1948; they had one son.

Footnotes

References
Biography, Who's Who

External links
Obituary, Daily Telegraph, 13 October 2011

Military personnel from Yorkshire
People from Barnsley
1922 births
2011 deaths
Highland Light Infantry soldiers
Royal Army Physical Training Corps soldiers
British Army personnel of World War II
Assistant Commissioners of Police of the Metropolis
Chief Constables of Devon and Cornwall Police
Liberal Party (UK) parliamentary candidates
Fellows of Corpus Christi College, Cambridge
Fellows of Nuffield College, Oxford
Academics of the University of Strathclyde
Academics of the University of Portsmouth
English non-fiction writers
British criminologists
Penologists
Members of the Middle Temple
English barristers
Commanders of the Order of the British Empire
English recipients of the Queen's Police Medal
English male non-fiction writers
20th-century English lawyers